Sir Timothy Patrick Cleary (27 April 1900 – 15 August 1962) was a New Zealand lawyer and judge. He was born in Meeanee, New Zealand, on 27 April 1900. Throughout his life he was a devout Catholic.

In the 1959 Queen's Birthday Honours, Cleary was appointed a Knight Bachelor, in recognition of his service as a judge of the Court of Appeal.

References

1900 births
1962 deaths
20th-century New Zealand judges
District Court of New Zealand judges
Court of Appeal of New Zealand judges
New Zealand Roman Catholics
People from Napier, New Zealand
New Zealand Knights Bachelor